The Tharp House is a historic house at 15 North West Avenue in Fayetteville, Arkansas.  It is a -story wood-frame house, with Queen Anne styling.  Its front facade is three bays wide, with a projecting square gable-roofed section to the right, and the main entrance in the center, sheltered by a porch that wraps around the left side.  A large gabled dormer projects from the hip roof above the entrance, large enough for a doorway and a small balcony.  Built in 1904 by Moses Tharp, it is an unusual local example of late Queen Anne style.

The house was listed on the National Register of Historic Places in 2004.

See also
National Register of Historic Places listings in Washington County, Arkansas

References

Houses on the National Register of Historic Places in Arkansas
Queen Anne architecture in Arkansas
Houses completed in 1904
Houses in Fayetteville, Arkansas
National Register of Historic Places in Fayetteville, Arkansas